Megahy is a surname. Notable people with the surname include:

Francis Megahy (1935–2020), British film director
Thomas Megahy (1929–2008), British teacher and politician